Joksimović or Joksimovic is a surname. Notable people with the name include:

Dejan Joksimović, former Yugoslav/Serbian association footballer
Igor Joksimovic (born 1980), Bosnian football striker
Jadranka Joksimović (born 1978), Serbian politician
Milan Joksimović (born 1990), Serbian footballer
Nebojša Joksimović (basketball) (born 1981), Slovenian basketball player
Nebojša Joksimović (footballer) (born 1981), Serbian football player
Obren Joksimović, Serbian politician
Željko Joksimović (born 1972), one of the most popular singers and composers of Serbia

Serbian surnames